Song of My Heart is a 1948 American historical drama film directed by Benjamin Glazer and starring Frank Sundström, Audrey Long and Cedric Hardwicke. It is a highly fictionalised biopic of the nineteenth century Russian composer Pyotr Ilyich Tchaikovsky. It was distributed by Allied Artists.

Cast

References

Bibliography
  James Wierzbicki. Music in the Age of Anxiety: American Music in the Fifties. University of Illinois Press, 2016.

External links
 

1948 films
1940s biographical drama films
1940s musical drama films
American biographical drama films
American musical drama films
Films with screenplays by Benjamin Glazer
Films set in Russia
Films set in the 19th century
Films about classical music and musicians
Films about composers
Allied Artists films
Cultural depictions of Pyotr Ilyich Tchaikovsky
American black-and-white films
1948 drama films
1940s English-language films
1940s American films